Giedra Gudauskienė (July 10, 1923, Kaunas – May 22, 2006, Los Angeles) was Lithuanian woman composer, ethnomusicologist, and pedagogue.

References

1923 births
2006 deaths